The Incident is a 1990 American made-for-television drama film directed by Joseph Sargent and starring Walter Matthau and Harry Morgan which was originally broadcast on CBS on March 4, 1990. The film marked Matthau's return to television after over 20 years.

The film was followed by two sequels: Against Her Will: An Incident in Baltimore (1992) and Incident in a Small Town (1994).

Plot
The story takes place in the year 1944 in Lincoln Bluff, a fictional, small Colorado town. The Second World War is still raging when the town's only doctor, George Hansen, is murdered at a local US Army camp, Camp Bremen, holding German prisoners of war.

Harmon J. Cobb, a local lawyer, is railroaded by Judge Bell into being the defense attorney for Geiger, the German prisoner accused of killing the doctor, who also happened to have been Cobb's friend. Cobb has no desire for Geiger to be acquitted; in addition to sharing in the wartime anti-German sentiment, Cobb's son is an American soldier fighting the Germans. However, to preserve his hard-earned standing as a top-notch attorney, he begins to build a nominal defense by asking several of Geiger's subordinates who are also prisoners at Camp Bremen to act as character witnesses. However, they all refuse to testify, and when Cobb asks Geiger to pull rank on them to get them on the stand, he refuses. Moreover, he angrily accuses Cobb of being disinterested in the real goings-on in the camp.

Cobb does not press Geiger for more explanation of his comments. However, when a local acquaintance comes forward with more information, Cobb begins to suspect not only that Geiger is in fact innocent, but that Hansen's death is only the tip of the iceberg in illicit operations at Camp Bremen.

Cast
 Walter Matthau as Harmon Cobb 
 Susan Blakely as Billie 
 Robert Carradine as Domsczek 
 Peter Firth as Geiger 
 Barnard Hughes as Doc Hansen 
 Harry Morgan as Judge Bell 
 William Schallert as Wallace 
 Ariana Richards as Nancy 
 Norbert Weisser as Riefenstahl 
 Douglas Rowe as Clarence 
 Joe Horváth as Major Lilly (as Joe Horvath) 
 Helen Stenborg as Edna Mae Hansen 
 Henry Crowell Jr. as Corporal Sweazy 
 David Underwood as Lieutenant Morton 
 Robert MacKenzie as Sergeant Osias (as Robert Mckenzie)

Reception
John J. O'Connor gave the film a highly positive review in The New York Times, deeming it "a first-rate production". While he found a number of details in the script didn't make sense, he praised the historical authenticity of both the story and the production, as well as Matthau's immense presence in the lead role.

Awards

References

External links 
 
 

1990 television films
1990 films
World War II war crimes trials films
Films set in 1944
CBS network films
Primetime Emmy Award for Outstanding Made for Television Movie winners
Films directed by Joseph Sargent
1990 drama films
Films set in Colorado
Films scored by Laurence Rosenthal